Noël Calone (12 November 1904 – 21 October 1978) was a French sailor. He competed in the 5.5 Metre event at the 1952 Summer Olympics.

References

External links
 

1904 births
1978 deaths
French male sailors (sport)
Olympic sailors of France
Sailors at the 1952 Summer Olympics – 5.5 Metre
People from La Seyne-sur-Mer
Sportspeople from Var (department)